Senator McDaniel may refer to:

Chris McDaniel (born 1972), Mississippi State Senate
Christian McDaniel (born 1977), Kentucky State Senate
Henry Dickerson McDaniel (1836–1926), Georgia
Rodger McDaniel (born 1948), Wyoming State Senate
William McDaniel (politician) (1801–1866), Missouri State Senate